The NAB AFL Rising Star award is given annually to a stand out young player in the Australian Football League. The 2010 Ron Evans Medal was awarded to Dan Hannebery of the Sydney Swans.

Eligibility
Every round, an Australian Football League rising star nomination is given to a stand out young player. To be eligible for the award, a player must be under 21 on 1 January of that year, have played 10 or fewer senior games and not been suspended during the season.  At the end of the year, one of the 22 nominees is the winner of award.

Nominations

*ineligible to win the NAB Rising Star due to suspension.

Final voting

References

2010 in Australian rules football
2010 Australian Football League season
Australian rules football-related lists